The Admiraliteitsbrug is a drawbridge over the Buizengat in Rotterdam. The bridge is located on Willem Ruyslaan and connects Oostzeedijk to the Maasboulevard.

The bridge is unmanned and any request to open it must be submitted to the ministry (aangevraagd) at the Boerengatbrug. The bridge will not be operated if the Boerengatbrug or Oostbrug is opened or when the dam is closed.

Steel bridges in the Netherlands
Bridges in Rotterdam